The 20th African Championships in Athletics was held in Durban, South Africa from 22 to 26 June 2016. It was the second time that Durban and South Africa hosted this competition. 720 athletes from 43 African national federations participated.

Medal summary

Men

Women

Medal table

See also
2016 European Athletics Championships

References

Entry standards
Day 1 results
Day 2 results
Day 3 results
Day 4 results
Day 5 results

External links
Official site
Confederation of African Athletics championships page
Results 

 
African Championships in Athletics
2016
Athletics Championships
African Championships in Athletics
Sports competitions in Durban
International athletics competitions hosted by South Africa
African Championships in Athletics